A forager is one who forages, i. e., looks for forage.

Forager may refer to:
 A hunter-gatherer
 Non-timber forest products (general discussion)
 Forager (comics), a fictional superhero published by DC Comics
 Foraging theory, a branch of behavioral ecology
 ST Forager, a tug-in service with Steel & Bennie Ltd, Glasgow, from 1947 to 1962
 The Mariana and Palau Islands campaign in World War II, also known as Operation Forager
 The Forager, a 1910 American silent film
 Forager (video game) a video game developed by HopFrog and released by Humble Bundle
 Forager (HBC vessel), operated by the HBC from 1839-1841, see Hudson's Bay Company vessels

See also
 Forage (disambiguation)
 Forage analysis
 Forage harvester
 Forage War
 :Category:Forages